Verena Vogt (born 15 August 1952) is a Chilean alpine skier. She competed in two events at the 1968 Winter Olympics.

References

1952 births
Living people
Chilean female alpine skiers
Olympic alpine skiers of Chile
Alpine skiers at the 1968 Winter Olympics
Sportspeople from Santiago
20th-century Chilean women